Michel Bonnevie (19 November 1921 – 6 September 2018) was a French basketball player who competed in the 1948 Summer Olympics. He was part of the French national basketball team, which won the silver medal.

References

External links
profile
Article on Michel Bonnevie's 90th birthday

1921 births
2018 deaths
People from Chaville
French men's basketball players
Olympic basketball players of France
Basketball players at the 1948 Summer Olympics
Olympic silver medalists for France
Olympic medalists in basketball
Medalists at the 1948 Summer Olympics
Stade Français basketball players